Hugh Hart Lusk (1837 – 8 September 1926) was a 19th-century Member of Parliament from the Auckland Region in New Zealand.

A barrister and solicitor, he represented the Franklin electorate from 18 January 1876 to 16 April 1878, when he resigned.

Lusk married Mary Butler in Mangonui in November 1864. Four months earlier, in the same church, his elder brother Daniel had married Mary's elder sister Ellen. Hugh and Mary's sons Hugh and Harold played first-class cricket in New Zealand.

Lusk moved to Australia in 1890 and later to the United States, where he lived for many years before returning to Auckland.

Works
Lusk wrote under the pseudonym Owen Hall. His works include:

The Track of a Storm (1895) a convict novel
Eureka (1899), one of the earliest Australian science-fiction novels 
Jetsam (1897) 
Hernando (1902)

Under his own name, Lusk wrote books on social welfare in New Zealand and compiled History of Australia for Schools (Sydney, 1891).

References

External links
 
 Read Chapter 1 of Eureka from the Lost Worlds Australia Anthology.

Members of the New Zealand House of Representatives
1837 births
1926 deaths
New Zealand MPs for North Island electorates
19th-century New Zealand politicians
Hugh